Commission v Italy (1972) Case 39/72 is an EU law case, concerning the conflict of law between a national legal system and European Union law.

Facts
The Commission brought enforcement proceedings against Italy for failing to enforce Regulations on dairy on time. The EU wanted to stop over-production of dairy products  by introducing a premium for slaughter of (dairy) cows. The Italian government decreed the regulations were ‘deemed to be included’ in the decree, and reproduced them with extra procedural provisions. However, Italy failed to operate the scheme on time.

Judgment
The Court of Justice held that Italy was in breach both for delay, and also ‘the manner of giving effect’ to the Regulation. In one respect it departed from the Regulation, as it did not account for extension of time allowed for slaughter.

See also

European Union law

Notes

References

External links

Court of Justice of the European Union case law
Italian case law